Kourkovo is a rural locality (a village) in Gorod Vyazniki, Vyaznikovsky District, Vladimir Oblast, Russia. The population was 142 as of 2010. There are 2 streets.

Geography 
Kourkovo is located 12 km west of Vyazniki (the district's administrative centre) by road. Korshunikha is the nearest rural locality.

References 

Rural localities in Vyaznikovsky District